The Mount Vernon Stakes is an American Thoroughbred horse race held annually near the end of May at Belmont Park in Elmont, New York. Contested on turf at a distance of a mile (8 furlongs), it is restricted to Fillies and mares age three and older who were bred in the State of New York

The Mount Vernon Stakes is named for the city of Mount Vernon in Westchester County, New York. Since inception in 1979, the race has been contested at various distances:
 1 mile : 2014–present
  miles : 1979–1982, 1989–1996, 2008–2013
  miles : 1997–2007
  miles : 1983–1988

Due to course conditions, the race was switched to dirt in 1988, 1990 and 2003.

The Mount Vernon was run in two divisions in 1989, 1992, 2002, 2004, and 2005.

Historical notes

Ángel Cordero Jr. won this race as a jockey three times (1980, 1982, 1989) and as a trainer in 1996.

Records
Speed  record:

 1:32.87 – Invading Humor (2015) (at current distance of 8 furlongs) 
 1:40.00 – Her Favorite (1992) (at previous distance of  miles)

Most wins:
 2 – Gitchee Goomie (2011, 2012)
 2 – Fifty Five (2019, 2020)

Most wins by an owner:
 3 – Michael Dubb (2013, 2017, 2018)

Most wins by a jockey:
 4 – José A. Santos (1987, 1991, 2000, 2005)
 4 – Javier Castellano (2006, 2017, 2019, 2020)

Most wins by a trainer:
 3 – Leo O'Brien (1988, 1994, 1995)

Winners

References
 The 2010 Mount Vernon Stakes at New York Thoroughbred Breeders, Inc.

Turf races in the United States
Horse races in New York (state)
Mile category horse races for fillies and mares
Recurring sporting events established in 1979
Belmont Park
1979 establishments in New York (state)